The electoral division of Russell was an electoral division in the Tasmanian Legislative Council of Australia. It existed from 1885 to 1999, when it was renamed Murchison.

Members

See also
Tasmanian Legislative Council electoral divisions

References
Past election results for Russell

Former electoral districts of Tasmania
1999 disestablishments in Australia